HADES, Spain-OSCAR 115 or SO-115, is a Spanish amateur radio satellite.

Specifications 

HADES was designed and built jointly by AMSAT-EA and students from the European University of Aerospace Engineering in Madrid, Spain. The satellite is a PocketQube form factor 1.5P nano-satellite (5 × 5 × 7.5 cm) and carries an FM repeater using the callsign AM6SAT. Another payload comes from the University of Brno and consists of a miniature camera module that transmits the captured images as an audio signal in SSTV mode. The SSTV formats it uses are compatible with Robot36, Robot72, MP73 and MP115. This design is based on that of PSAT-2.

Mission 
The satellite was launched on January 13, 2022 from Cape Canaveral Space Force Station, Florida, United States. On January 16, signals from the satellite could be received and assigned. On January 23, 2022, the designation Spain-OSCAR-115 or SO-115 was awarded by the OSCAR number coordinator of AMSAT-NA.

See also 

 OSCAR

References

External links 
 Gunter's Space Page

Satellites orbiting Earth
Amateur radio satellites
Spacecraft launched in 2022